Piercia is a genus in the geometer moth family (Geometridae). It belongs to subfamily Larentiinae, but therein its relationships are fairly obscure. About 10 species occur in southern and eastern Asia, but most – almost 50 as of 2005 – are found in Africa.

Selected species
Species of Piercia include:
 Piercia alpinaria Krüger, 2005
 Piercia dryas (Prout, 1915)
 Piercia lichenocosmia Krüger, 2005
 Piercia petraria Krüger, 2005
 Piercia prasinaria (Warren, 1901)
 Piercia smaragdinata (Walker, 1862)
 Piercia cf. smaragdinata 'Janse 1933'

Footnotes

References
  (2005): New species of geometrid moths from Lesotho (Lepidoptera: Geometroidea: Geometridae). Annals of the Transvaal Museum 42: 19–45. HTML abstract
  (2004): Butterflies and Moths of the World, Generic Names and their Type-species – Piercia. Version of 2004-NOV-05. Retrieved 2011-APR-21.
  (2009): Markku Savela's Lepidoptera and some other life forms – Piercia. Version of 2009-APR-29. Retrieved 2011-APR-21.

Geometridae